"Miami Vice" is a song by Congolese–French singer and rapper Gims published on Transcendance, a reissue of the Ceinture noire album. It was released on 15 March 2019 as the 11th single from Ceinture noire and the first of its reissue.

The song is largely inspired by the song "Self Control" originally written and performed in 1984 by Raf and covered by Laura Branigan the same year.

Commercial reception 
The single has ranked in three countries: Belgium, France and Switzerland. In France, Miami Vice ranked for twenty weeks in the ranking of singles (downloads and streaming), from March to July 2019, or five consecutive months. He went straight to the 39th position, his highest ranking. On the other hand, in the ranking of pure sales (without streaming), the title entered 5th place, which is its best ranking. It was certified gold by Syndicat National de l'Édition Phonographique.

Charts

Certifications

Release history

References 

2019 songs
2019 singles
French pop songs
Gims songs
Songs written by Gims